"Before You Go" is a song by Scottish singer-songwriter Lewis Capaldi, released as a single from the extended edition of his debut studio album Divinely Uninspired to a Hellish Extent on 19 November 2019. The song was made available upon pre-order of the extended edition. The song was sent to US radio stations on 6 January 2020 as his second US single. It reached number one on the Irish Singles Chart in November 2019 and on the UK Singles Chart in January 2020, becoming Capaldi's second chart-topper in the UK and third in Ireland.

Background and composition
Capaldi revealed in a social media post that the song was "by far the most personal tune" he had ever written. According to Idolator, the song "deals with the emotional aftermath of suicide", and was inspired by the suicide of Capaldi's aunt while Capaldi was a child. "Before You Go" is played in the tempo of 112 BPM and key signature of E♭ Major.

Critical reception
Clash Music'''s Robin Murray called the track "trademark Capaldi", further describing it as "a rousing piece of acoustic songwriting with a driving vocal".

 Music video 
Released on 24 January 2020 and directed by Kyle Thrash, the video is of happy moments recalled by a group of friends as they pay tribute to a young woman (played by actress Sasha Lane), whose suicide has shocked them, with clips of Lewis Capaldi playing his guitar and singing appearing occasionally.

The video has gained over 310 million views as of February 2023.

Personnel
Credits adapted from Tidal.
 Lewis Capaldi – songwriting, vocals
 Ben Kohn – songwriting, production, bass guitar
 Pete Kelleher – songwriting, production, keyboards
 Tom Bames – songwriting, production, drums
 Phil Plested – songwriting, background vocals
 Vern Asbury – guitar
 Rory Dewar – Art Design
 Robert Vosgien – master engineering
 Mark "Spike" Stent – mixing
 Chris Bishop – vocal engineering

Charts

Weekly charts

Year-end charts

Certifications

Release history

Usage in media
Capaldi has performed the song for Top of the Pops, the Swiss Music Awards, the American Music Awards, the Streamy Awards, and Dick Clark's New Year's Rockin' Eve.  

American singer Jesse McCartney performed the song during the finale of The Masked Singer'''s third season.
It was also sung by Charlie Simpson on the UK version of Masked Singer during the finale, in which he won after the performance of Before You Go.

References

2019 singles
2019 songs
Capitol Records singles
Irish Singles Chart number-one singles
Lewis Capaldi songs
Songs about suicide
Songs based on actual events
Songs written by Lewis Capaldi
Songs written by Ben Kohn
Songs written by Peter Kelleher (songwriter)
Songs written by Tom Barnes (songwriter)
Song recordings produced by TMS (production team)
UK Singles Chart number-one singles
Universal Music Group singles
Vertigo Records singles
Pop ballads